The National Museum of Giuseppe Verdi is a music museum in Busseto, Province of Parma, Italy. 

It is dedicated to Giuseppe Verdi and is housed at the Renaissance Villa Pallavicino.

The museum was inaugurated on 10, October 2009 on the 196th anniversary of Verdi's birth in Busseto.
The museum follows the historical path of the works of Verdi and has arranged
27 exhibition spaces based on the 27 works of the composer.

See also
 Teatro Giuseppe Verdi
 Villa Verdi

Sources

Museums in Italy
Giuseppe Verdi